Semaphore railway line was a railway line in the Australian state of South Australia located in the north-west of Adelaide servicing the suburbs of Semaphore and Exeter. It had two stations: Semaphore and Exeter. The line opened in 1878 and closed in 1978.

History
The Semaphore line was extended from Port Adelaide by South Australian Railways on 7 January 1878 with no intermediate stations. It was to serve both the new overseas shipping jetty at Semaphore, and for defence logistics along Military Road (in support of nearby Fort Largs and Fort Glanville). It remained the main line until the Outer Harbor railway line was extended north from a junction created at Glanville in 1908.

In 1917 when the Semaphore to Rosewater and Albert Park tram line was opened there was an unresolved dispute over the tramline crossing the railway line near Exeter station. The Railway Commissioner disallowed trams to cross over the railway line. Trams continued to operate with one isolated tram service between the crossing and Largs, with passengers having to walk across the railway line to use the remaining tramline. After a short period of time, the Municipal Tramways Trust continued full service along the line regardless of not having the rail commissioner's consent. In response to this rail workers threatened to cut the tramline off by dumping a load of sleepers on the tramway tracks. An agreement was eventually made to allow trams to cross the line on the condition that a signal cabin be installed and a signal man was to cut off power to trams when a train approached preventing trams from proceeding over the railway tracks. This system nearly caused a disaster when a tram happened to be using the crossing when power was cut off. The tram was nearly stranded on the railway line and an accident was barely avoided. The switches for cutting of power was then removed and replaced by a system of traffic lights.

The line closed on 29 October 1978. This was partly because traders on the north side of Semaphore road claims of losing business. The original stations have been demolished and practically no evidence of the stations remains. The original rail track has since been dismantled, with only the large median strip along Semaphore Road remaining.

Route
The original line continued from the terminus at Port Adelaide west along St Vincent Street, then over the new bridge and north then west along Semaphore Road. The midpoint of the line was Exeter station, which was located to the east side of where Swan Terrace and Woolnough Road intersect. The line terminated right next to the Esplanade at Semaphore station, which was located east of Esplanade Road (14.9 kilometres from Adelaide station). Its station platform was level with the northern part of the road. It later became a branch from Glanville station, and the route was altered in 1916 to avoid St Vincent Street.

Line guide

See also 
Semaphore (disambiguation)

References

Thomas Wilson, The Relationship Between a Transport Link and Land Use Development between Adelaide and Port Adelaide South Australia, Adelaide, 1965
J.C. Radcliff. C.J.M. Steele, Adelaide Road Passenger Transport 1836 - 1958, Libraries Board of South Australia, Adelaide, 1974

Closed railway lines in South Australia
Railway lines opened in 1882
Railway lines closed in 1978
Lefevre Peninsula